Northwest Corridor may refer to:

 Northwest Corridor, part of Interstate 75 in Georgia
 Northwest Corridor (Lancaster), a neighborhood in Lancaster, Pennsylvania, USA
 Northwest Corridor (Minnesota)
 Northwest Corridor HOV/BRT, a reversible-lane widening of Interstate 75 in northwestern metro Atlanta